is a Japanese singer from Sapporo, Hokkaido, signed to Sacra Music. After being discovered through the Japanese video sharing website Niconico, Aoi made her major debut in 2011 with the release of her first single "Memoria", whose title track was used as the first ending theme to the 2011 anime television series Fate/Zero.

Aoi's music has been featured in various anime television series such as Sword Art Online, Kill la Kill, and The Heroic Legend of Arslan, as well as other television programs such as Rank Okoku. She has performed at various anime conventions in Asia, Europe, North and South America. She has cited her interest in anime, as well as artists such as Evanescence, Slipknot, and Do As Infinity, as influences in her career. In October 2016, following prolonged bouts of poor health, she announced an indefinite hiatus from musical activities following a two-day concert at the Nippon Budokan in November 2016. In February 2018, it was announced that she would resume her activities later that year.

Biography

Early life and career
Aoi was born in Sapporo on November 30. She had an interest in music since her childhood, and learned to play the guitar while in junior high school. As part of pursuing a career as a musician, she formed a band during her high school years. At one point, as she felt that her dream of becoming a musician was fading away, she considered pursuing a career as a nurse. As she did not want to give up on her dreams, she decided to upload videos of her singing online. Her music break came after being discovered through the Japanese video sharing site Niconico. She first released the song "Frozen Eyez", which was included in a 2011 issue of the magazine LisAni!.

Major debut
Aoi made her major debut under SME Records with the release of the single "Memoria" on October 19, 2011, the title track of which was used as the first ending theme song to the 2011 anime series Fate/Zero. Her second single "Aurora", which was released on September 5, 2012, is used as the fourth opening theme song to the 2011 anime series Mobile Suit Gundam AGE. She released the mini-album Prayer on April 11, 2012; the album includes seven image songs for Fate/Zero. Her third single "Innocence", which was released on November 21, 2012, was used as the second opening theme song to the 2012 anime series Sword Art Online. Her first full album, Blau, was released on January 30, 2013; the album peaked at No. 4 on Oricon's weekly charted and charted for seven weeks. She made an appearance at Seattle's Sakura-Con anime convention in March 2013, performing her first three singles.

Aoi's fourth single "Cobalt Sky", was released on June 26, 2013. Her fifth single, "Sirius", was released on November 13, 2013, and was used as the first opening theme to the 2013 anime series Kill la Kill. Her song "Sanbika", released on the same single as "Sirius", was used as an insert song throughout the series. Her sixth single, which was released on January 1, 2014, was used as the opening theme to the special Sword Art Online: Extra Edition. She released her second album Aube on January 29, 2014; the album peaked at No. 6 on the Oricon weekly charts and charted for eight weeks. Her seventh single "Ignite", released on August 20, 2014, was used as the first opening theme to the 2014 anime series Sword Art Online II. Her eighth single "Tsunagaru Omoi", released on November 12, 2014, was used as the opening theme for the TBS show Rank Okoku.

Aoi's ninth single, "Genesis", released on February 18, 2015, is used as the ending theme to the 2015 anime series Aldnoah Zero:2nd Season. Her tenth single "Lapis Lazuli", released on April 22, 2015, was used as the ending theme to the 2015 anime series The Heroic Legend of Arslan. She released the digital single  on March 25, 2015; the title track is used as the opening theme of the 2015 video game Sword Art Online: Lost Song. Her third album D'Azur was released on June 24, 2015; the album peaked at No. 4 on the Oricon weekly charts and charted for fifteen weeks. Due to a sudden illness, she cancelled a scheduled appearance at Animelo Summer Live in August 2015, although she pushed through with appearances in the Philippines, Hong Kong, Taiwan, and Singapore later that year. Her eleventh single, "Shoegazer", was released on October 28, 2015.

Aoi released her twelfth single "Accentier", was released on March 2, 2016 and is used as the opening theme for the PlayStation Vita/PlayStation 4 game Digimon World: Next Order. Her thirteenth single  was released on July 20, 2016, and was used as the opening theme for The Heroic Legend of Arslan: Dust Storm Dance. Her first and second greatest hits albums titled Best -E- and Best -A-, were released on October 19, 2016 in commemoration of the 5th anniversary of her career. Best -E- includes "Tsubasa", "Innocence", "Genesis", "Memoria", and "Cynthia no Hikari"; Best -A- includes "Lapis Lazuli", "Aurora", "Ignite", "Accentier", "Sirius", "Cobalt Sky", "Niji no Oto", and "Frozen Eyez".

Hiatus and return
On August 17, 2016, it was announced on her official Facebook page that she would put her career on hiatus due to poor health. Her remaining appearances for 2016 and a scheduled performance at Anime Festival Indonesia 2016, Animax Musix 2017 in Osaka in January 2017 were cancelled. On October 14, 2016, her management announced that she would put her musical career on indefinite hiatus following a final two concerts at Nippon Budokan on November 4 and 5, 2016.

On February 1, 2018, her website updated with an image of a flashing blue light. This was followed by an announcement on February 8 that she would resume her activities with the release of the music video  on YouTube. Her management also announced that she had transferred to the music label Sacra Music. It was confirmed on March 7, 2018 that her next release would be the opening theme to anime Sword Art Online Alternative Gun Gale Online, titled . The song "Ryūsei" was released digitally on April 22, 2018, and received a physical release together with the song "Yakusoku" on June 13, 2018 as her fourteenth single. She held a concert at the Nippon Budokan to commemorate the resumption of her activities. Her fifteenth single  was released on October 24, 2018; the song is used as the first ending theme to the anime series Sword Art Online: Alicization. Her fourth album Fragment was released on April 17, 2019. Her sixteenth single  was released digitally on July 6, 2019, and received a physical release on August 28, 2019; the title song is used as the opening theme to the anime series Granbelm. Her seventeenth single  was released digitally on October 19, 2019, and received a physical release on November 27, 2019; the title song is used as the ending theme to the anime series Fate/Grand Order - Absolute Demonic Front: Babylonia. She released her eighteenth single "I will..." digitally on July 20, 2020, and received a physical release on August 12, 2020; the title song is used as the ending theme of television series anime Sword Art Online: Alicization - War of Underworld: Part 2 . Her nineteenth single "Kodo" was released digitally on April 3, 2021, and received a physical release on June 16, 2021 the title song is used as the 2nd opening theme to the anime series Back Arrow. She released the single "Hello Hello Hello" on August 17, 2022; the title song is used as the 2nd ending theme to the anime series A Couple of Cuckoos.

In January 2023, Aoi's management announced she would be taking a temporary hiatus due to health reasons.

Musical style and influences
Aoi's musical style has been influenced by her love of anime, as well as artists such as Evanescence, Slipknot, and Tomiko Van of Do As Infinity. She initially did not show her mouth on physical release images, only revealing her full appearance during a Niconico livestream in June 2012. According to her, this was to give her a "mysterious aura" and because she wanted to emphasize her eyes, which she described as "powerful". Speaking to the website J-Pop Go before her London concert in 2015, she explained how she believed she would have never been discovered had it not been for the internet, and how she believes that it can be used as a tool for her to "connect the world" and "make dreams come true".

Aoi's songwriting style is that, when producing a song that would be used in an anime, she would first read the original source material or the anime script, and for songs that would be used in games, she would first play the game or discuss the story with a producer. After this, she would write song lyrics that would take into account the feelings of the characters.

Aoi related the development of her singles "Memoria" and "Innocence" in an interview with Animate Times. She detailed how she always wanted to perform "light-conscious songs" even before she made her major debut, and that the theme of her early songs would be about "letting the light shine through your heart, even when times are difficult". "Memoria" was released at a time when she did not perform live as she still hid part of her face, and taking this into account, she wanted to make a song where emotions could be expressed through her singing as opposed to her mouth. For "Innocence", she wanted to produce a song that could express the growth and experiences that Sword Art Onlines main characters Kirito and Asuna were encountering.

For her first album Blau, Aoi wanted to express varying emotions such as "real sadness" or "fun expressions", as opposed to her previous releases, which described as mainly focusing on "singing with strength or sorrow". For example, with the song , she sang it with a thick voice to "allow her to sound like an adult".

For her single "Accentier", Aoi wanted to produce a song that had a theme of "seeking the light, no matter how dark it gets". The title of the single comes from the word "accent", as she wanted the song to be a song to "cheer people on" and give people "an 'accent' of happiness". Aoi had been a long time fan of the Digimon franchise and was very happy to be chosen to perform a song for it.

Discography

Studio and mini albums

Greatest Hits albums

Singles

Collaboration singles

Awards and nominations

Notes

References

External links
 

Living people
Musicians from Sapporo
Singers from Hokkaido
Japanese women pop singers
Sacra Music artists
Sony Music Entertainment Japan artists
Anime musicians
21st-century Japanese singers
21st-century Japanese women singers
1988 births